Melanie Darrow is a 1997 American television film directed by Gary Nelson and starring Delta Burke, Brian Bloom and Christopher Birt.

Plot
A lawyer takes on the case of a man accused of murdering his wealthy wife.

Cast
Delta Burke as Melanie Darrow
Brian Bloom as Det. Lou Darrow
Christopher Birt as Dwight
Bruce Abbott as Alex Kramer
Wendel Meldrum as Diane
Jonathan Banks as Arthur Abbot
Shawn Ashmore as David Abbott
Krista Bridges as Claire
Anthony J. Mifsud as Carlo Erhardt

Reception
Variety said of the film, "Nelson doesn’t bring much reality or humor to the thin telefare, and chances of Burke’s Melanie getting many more cases seem minimal."

References

USA Network original films
1997 television films
1997 films
American legal drama films
American drama television films
Films directed by Gary Nelson
1990s American films